Green Snake (青蛇, literal Chinese title: The Teal/Green Snake) is a 1993 Hong Kong fantasy film made by Tsui Hark. It is the adaptation of a novel of the same title by Lilian Lee.

The novel itself is a variation of a Chinese folk tale Madame White Snake, where Lillian Lee tells the story from the perspective of Xiaoqing, the Green Snake, who normally plays a supporting role behind the main character Bai Suzhen, the White Snake. As the title suggests, the movie also features Xiaoqing as the main character. Indian actresses, Nagma & Sridevi also feature in important pivotal roles from their side.

Plot 
The movie draws heavily upon the Buddhist belief of Saṃsāra and the cycle of reincarnation.
A Buddhist monk named Fat-hoi (Vincent Zhao) has trained for 20 years to banish demons from the Human World.  Fat-hoi does not believe in non-human beings seeking to improve themselves spiritually. He encounters a spider demon who has taken the form of a Buddhist priest.  He captures the spider demon who pleads with him as it has been spiritually refining itself for 200 years to be able to reincarnate.  Fat-hoi ignores his pleas and traps him in a magical cauldron and leaves the demon under a gazebo.  When the Buddhist beads of the demon continues to shine Fat-hoi realizes he may have made a mistake in interfering with the Spider's path to enlightenment.

A storm takes place while Fat-hoi goes into the forest and he attacks two Snake spirits. But after he noticed that they were only preventing rain from hitting a woman giving birth, he releases them. He is haunted by the images of the female body of the mother who gave birth. The two snakes, White Snake (Joey Wong) and Green Snake (Maggie Cheung), are on the rooftop of a feast.  Green Snake participates while White Snake sees a local scholar Hsui Xien (Wu Hsing-Kuo) in a nearby building. The two have been training for many centuries to take human form. White Snake is the more experienced one and falls in love with Hsui Xien.  She plans to have a family with him and continue with her attempt to reincarnate as a human; Green Snake is the younger and more impulsive of the two sisters but she is more prone to indulge in sensuality. They both move into their magically created house and start a successful medical practice in the town. Other than Hsui Xien's visit, the two gets another visit unexpectedly from a buffoonish Taoist whom Green Snake leaves the household to take care of. Because of White Snake's beautiful charms, Hsui Xien, once known as the toughest and most dedicated scholar of the village, is starting to lose his reputation.

In another heavy storm, a flood ravaged the village. White Snake and Green Snake helps to vanquish the flood and are helped by Fat-hoi, whom they remembered from the forest. After the flood is gone, White Snake and Green Snake tend to the medical needs of the villagers and they've become greatly respected. However, slowly, Green Snake is starting to envy White Snake and is beginning to yearn for the affections of a human, often using Hsui Xien as an experiment. Though she catches them multiple times, White Snake usually shrugs this off. One day while teaching, Hsui Xien spontaneously comes back to see White Snake but instead sees a large reptilian tail in their bathing room. He escapes and becomes paranoid of the symbolic snake-related objects in the village because of the Dragon Boat Festival. Drunk from gifts from the villagers, White Snake and Green Snake takes advantage and lies to him so it seemed as if he was hallucinating.

Because the festival is near, White Snake pushes Green Snake to leave the village knowing that the Xionghuang wine consumed only on this day will make Green Snake reveal her true form (due to her inexperience). Green Snake sulks, rebelling to leave because of her envy towards White Snake and Hsui Xien. The night of the festival, White Snake drags an obviously-scared Hsui Xien to drink the Xionghuang wine together. Since he already suspects his wife is a snake, Hsui Xien instead secretly dumps the wine into their pond where Green Snake was hiding; White Snake was not able to prevent Hsui Xien from seeing Green Snake's true form and he dies from shock. They are interrupted by the Taoist and his two apprentices again, which White Snake dispose of hastily. She decides to go to Kwun Lun Mountain to obtain the Lin-Chi Herb to bring him back to life, but because it is guarded by a Holy Crane, Green Snake decides to help out of guilt. Fat-hoi notices their presences and immediately follows them. After obtaining the Lin-Chi Herb, White Snake leaves Green Snake to fight against Fat-hoi but she is quickly defeated and is about to be captured in a cauldron.  Meanwhile White Snake restores Hsui Xien and they consummate their relationship.

Because of the doubts he having about human sensuality, the monk decided to challenge his inner strength by letting Green Snake try to seduce him while he meditates. When he loses the challenge, Green Snake quickly makes her way back to White Snake. Green Snake tells White Snake of Fat-hoi's challenge, White Snake shrugs her off, leaving Green Snake to assume that her older sister thinks she is inferior. To get a response out of White Snake, she attempts to seduce Hsui Xien and the two get into a fight in which White Snake triumphed. She reveals to Green Snake that she is pregnant and cannot be with her anymore.  Green Snake leaves.

Hsui Xien goes to his class to find Fat-hoi there.  Fat-hoi warns him that the sisters are snake demons and he is given an enchanted set of beads to protect himself from evil spirits.  Hsui Xien instead tosses the beads into the river. He arrives at home and pleads for the two to leave while he checks to see if Fat-hoi is near.  He inform them that he is aware they are snake demons.  The monk goes into their home and forcefully takes Hsui Xien into his Peaceful Land temple, situated atop an island peak, in order to "restore" him. Hsui Xien resists becoming a monk, White Snake appears at the temple and begs for the return of her husband. When Fat-hoi refuses, Green Snake joins White Snake and calls the monk on his promise to let them go if he lost the challenge. Green snake create a flood, attempting to flood the temple but Fat-hoi lifts the entire temple into the air to prevent the catastrophe. When it failed, Fat-hoi tries to suffocate the two with his surplice but again, the two snakes were able to overcome it.

White Snake suddenly goes into labor and the flood ran amok towards the village. Fat-hoi recedes his surplice thereby allowing Green Snake to enter the temple to retrieve Hsui Xien who has accepted becoming a monk. White Snake is struggling to keep her baby above water.  Fat-hoi saves the baby but White Snake is crushed by the temple which is now destroyed by the flood. Green Snake was able to rescue Hsui Xien from the temple.  After she fail to find White Snake, she kills Hsui Xien so that he can be with her sister in the afterlife. Fat-hoi intends to punish her for her crime but she forces him to acknowledge the fact that he too was complicit in the death of his fellow monks. Green Snake questions the feelings human love and leaves.  Fat-hoi stands alone with the baby.

Cast and roles 
 Maggie Cheung - Green Snake
 Joey Wong - White Snake
 Vincent Zhao - Monk Fat-hoi
 Wu Hsing-kuo - Hsui Xien
 Chan Dung-Mooi	
 Lau Kong - Blind Monk
 Nagma - Bharata Natyam dancer (as Najma)
 Tien Feng - Spider, Acrcha
 Sridevi as Indian Priestess, Ashayla
 Ma Cheng-miu

References

External links 
 
 
 
 HK cinemagic entry
 Review
 loveHkfilm entry

1993 films
Films directed by Tsui Hark
1990s fantasy comedy-drama films
Films based on the Legend of the White Snake
Hong Kong fantasy drama films
1993 comedy films
1993 drama films
Films with screenplays by Lilian Lee
1990s Hong Kong films